The 1873 Iowa gubernatorial election was held on October 14, 1873. Incumbent Republican Cyrus C. Carpenter defeated Democratic nominee Jacob G. Vale with 55.54% of the vote.

General election

Candidates
Cyrus C. Carpenter, Republican
Jacob G. Vale, Democratic

Results

References

1873
Iowa